The Voltaire Foundation is a research department of the University of Oxford, founded by Theodore Besterman in the 1970s. It publishes the definitive edition of the Complete Works of Voltaire (Œuvres complètes de Voltaire), as well as Oxford University Studies in the Enlightenment (previously SVEC, Studies on Voltaire and the Eighteenth Century), a monograph series devoted to the eighteenth century, and the correspondences (letters) of several key French thinkers. Directed by Professor Nicholas Cronk, it forms part of Oxford's Humanities Division.

Origin 
In the 1950s, the bibliographer and translator Theodore Besterman started to collect, transcribe and publish all of Voltaire's writings. He founded the Voltaire Institute and Museum in Geneva where he began publishing collected volumes of Voltaire's correspondence. During the final years of his life, Besterman opened discussions with the University of Oxford. These culminated in him naming the university his residuary legatee and arranging for the posthumous transfer of his collection of books and manuscripts, which included many collective editions, to the Taylor Institution (the university centre for modern languages). The Institution dedicated a room as the Voltaire Room in January 1975, to house Besterman's collection and The Taylor Institution's own. Following Besterman’s death on 10 November 1976, the Voltaire Foundation was vested permanently in the University of Oxford.

Complete Works of Voltaire 
The Complete Works of Voltaire (Œuvres complètes de Voltaire) is the first critical edition of the totality of his writings, arranged chronologically. Each text is published with an introduction, variants and detailed annotations. A provisional table of contents listed 146 volumes, since expanded to 200 volumes by completion of the series, which is planned for 2018.

Oxford University Studies in the Enlightenment (previously SVEC)

Since its inception as Studies on Voltaire and the Eighteenth Century in 1955, nearly 550 books have been published within this series. It publishes scholarly work in English or French across a broad range of disciplines, including history, the history of ideas/philosophy, the history of the book, theatre, literature, visual arts and music, science and economics, and gender studies.

References

External links

 Professor Nicholas Cronk profile, University of Oxford

Departments of the University of Oxford
Educational institutions established in the 1970s
Voltaire